Ramensky (masculine), Ramenskaya (feminine), or Ramenskoye (neuter) is the name of several inhabited localities in Russia.

Urban localities
Ramenskoye, Moscow Oblast, a town in Ramensky District of Moscow Oblast

Rural localities
Ramensky, Kaluga Oblast, a settlement in Mosalsky District of Kaluga Oblast
Ramensky, Kirov Oblast, a settlement in Burmakinsky Rural Okrug of Kirovo-Chepetsky District of Kirov Oblast
Ramensky, Moscow Oblast, a settlement in Kulikovskoye Rural Settlement of Dmitrovsky District of Moscow Oblast
Ramenskoye, Krasnoyarsk Krai, a village in Kirikovsky Selsoviet of Pirovsky District of Krasnoyarsk Krai
Ramenskoye, Tver Oblast, a village in Rzhevsky District of Tver Oblast